Clachtoll is a coastal fishing and crofting village situated on the Bay of Clachtoll, in the ancient parish of Assynt, Sutherland county, in the Highland Council area on the north western edge of Scotland.

Its name derives from Gaelic, and refers to the very large broken rock, the remains of a natural arch (Gaelic: "clach" is "rock" and "toll" means "hole", "cavity", etc.) on the headland nearby.

Between 2017 and 2020 archaeological excavation of an Iron Age broch, a double walled tower standing by the sea shore with walls still standing up to 3 metres/10 feet high, although believed to have been originally much taller, revealed that it was probably built between 400 and 250 BC, and was burnt down between BC 50 and 25 AD .

References

Populated places in Sutherland
Natural arches of Scotland